University of Oum El Bouaghi or Larbi Ben M'hidi University of Oum El Bouaghi (is a university located in  Algeria in the Oum El Bouaghi Province. It was established in 2013.

See also 
 List of universities in Algeria

References

External links
 

2013 establishments in Algeria
Oum El Bouaghi
Buildings and structures in Oum El Bouaghi Province
Universities in Algeria